The Treaty Centre is an enclosed shopping mall in the town centre of Hounslow in Greater London, England. Opened on 29 September 1987 and located on the High Street, the Treaty Centre offers 270,194 square feet of retail space and is anchored by Wilkinsons. It has an average weekly footfall of 195,000 people.

History
The centre took two years to build and more than 10 years in planning. The  site was built on the site of a former library and civic hall buildings dating back to 1905 which were demolished.

In 2006 a rival shopping centre called the Blenheim Centre was built to the north.

In 2011 the centre was acquired by Quidnet Capital for £37 million and in the following years the centre was refurbished.

Gallery

References

Shopping centres in the London Borough of Hounslow
Shopping malls established in 1987
1987 establishments in England